Lena Ackebo (born 1950) is a Swedish comic creator who has been published in daily strip form, in albums, and in the art magazine Galago since the mid-1980s. Having a very distinct and graphic style, Ackebo mainly does satirical comics depicting the Swedish society. Since 2014, she has completely switched to writers and debuted with the world's most beautiful man in 2016 who received an independent follow-up in Dear Barbro in 2017.

References

External links
 Galago

Swedish cartoonists
Swedish women cartoonists
Swedish satirists
1950 births
Living people
20th-century Swedish women writers
20th-century Swedish women artists
21st-century Swedish women writers
21st-century Swedish women artists